Jakubčovice nad Odrou is a municipality and village in the Nový Jičín District in the Moravian-Silesian Region of the Czech Republic. It has about 600 inhabitants.

History
The first written mention of Jakubčovice nad Odrou is from 1374.

During the World War II, the German occupiers operated two forced labour subcamps of the Stalag VIII-B/344 prisoner-of-war camp at the local quarry.

Sports
Football club Jakubčovice Fotbal is based there. Since 2007, it has been participating in lower amateur tiers.

References

Villages in Nový Jičín District